Jules Marcel de Coppet (18 May 1881 in Paris – 31 August 1968 in Quiberville, France) was a French colonial administrator stationed in several countries in Africa before becoming governor-general of French West Africa.

He was also a significant figure in the French intellectual and literary life of his time, close to André Gide and especially Roger Martin du Gard, whose daughter he married.

Biography
Coppet was governor of the colony of Dahomey from 1933 until 1934.  From 7 May 1934 to 18 July 1935, he governed French Somaliland.

Succeeding Jules Brévié, he became governor-general of French West Africa on September 27, 1936, and retained the position until July 14, 1938. Upon his departure, Léon Geismar took over for a few months until the arrival of Pierre Boisson.

He also oversaw the creation of an encyclopedia devoted to Madagascar which was published in 1947.

See also
 History of Benin
 List of colonial heads of Côte d'Ivoire
 List of colonial heads of French Sénégal
 List of colonial heads of Chad
 List of colonial governors of Dahomey
 List of colonial heads of Djibouti (French Somaliland)
 History of Madagascar

Bibliography

References

External links
List of governor generals of French West Africa
 List of governor generals of French West Africa from 1895 to 1920

1881 births
1968 deaths
French colonial governors and administrators
Governors of French West Africa
Colonial Governors of French Madagascar
French colonial governors of Mauritania
French people in French Dahomey